A card with the inscriptions P. F. (standing for the French words "pour féliciter") is used as a New Year card expressing good wishes for the coming year or in social correspondence extending congratulations.

Usage
The PF cards are generally used only in the Czech Republic and Slovakia.

History

Following the tradition established by the New Year cards of Charles Chotek of Chotkow, the highest Burgrave of Bohemia (function roughly similar to a prime minister) between 1826 and 1843, Czechs and Slovaks continue to use the old French inscription pour féliciter, or "P.F.", together with the number of an upcoming year, standing for "wishing you all the happiness in the new year". The author of many  Chotek's New Year Cards was Prague painter and engraver Josef Bergler.

Notes

External links

Glossary of Diplomatic Words
Expats on Czech Culture

Greeting cards
New Year celebrations